Lighthouse of Sancti Petri is a lighthouse located on the island of Sancti Petri between the town of  San Fernando and Chiclana de la Frontera in the Province of Cádiz, Andalusia, Spain. On October 28, 1918, the lighthouse was installed on the keep by the ruined castle.

See also

 List of lighthouses in Spain

References

External links
 Comisión de faros 
 Picture of Sancti Petri lighthouse

Lighthouses completed in 1918
Buildings and structures in San Fernando, Cádiz
Lighthouses in Andalusia
1918 establishments in Spain